Listroderes costirostris, the vegetable weevil, is a species of underwater weevil in the beetle family Curculionidae. It is found in North America.

References

Further reading

External links

 

Cyclominae
Articles created by Qbugbot
Beetles described in 1826